The 2017 ADAC Zurich 24 Hours of Nürburgring was the 45th running of the 24 Hours of Nürburgring. It took place over 25-28 May 2017.

The #29 Audi Sport Team Land / Land-Motorsport team won the race in an Audi R8 LMS.

Race results
Class winners in bold.

References

External links
 2017 24 Hours of Nürburgring official results

Nürburgring 24 Hours
2017 in German motorsport
May 2017 sports events in Germany